Dreams Worth More Than Money is the second studio album by American rapper Meek Mill. It was released on June 29, 2015, by Maybach Music Group and Atlantic Records. It was initially scheduled for release on September 9, 2014, however, it has been delayed few times due to Meek Mill's revoking of his probation on July 11, 2014, thus sentencing him to jail for 3 to 6 months. The album made its entry at number one on the US Billboard 200; and sold 246,000 album-equivalent units in its first week, with 215,000 coming from traditional album sales, marking as Meek's first number-one album on the chart. Due to the change in the tracking week by Nielsen Music SoundScan, its first week sales were counted towards its second week on the charts. At the 2016's Billboard Music Awards, the album won an award for Top Rap Album.

Background
Meek Mill said that with this album, he is focusing more on rapping than on money. He said that rappers, especially in Philadelphia, have not received credit for helping their communities going on to state during his interview with XXL stating, that "If I’m in the position to help, I’m gonna help." Meek Mill says that he has come to realize there is more to the music industry than wealth, a philosophy which resulted in the album's title, called Dreams Worth More Than Money.

Promotion 
In July 2014, Meek Mill released the trailer for the album. On May 10, 2015, Meek Mill released the statement the album track list has been finalized. Eleven new teasers were posted to his Instagram page. On Nicki Minaj's official website, she stated that they were filming a music video for his second single from the album, called "All Eyes on You". The track features guest vocals from Minaj herself, and American recording artist Chris Brown. The music video was directed by Benny Boom. On July 22, 2015, Meek Mill publicly criticized rapper Drake on Twitter after being upset with Drake's alleged use of his ghostwriter appearing on the album.

Both of the album's respective tracks, the beginner, "Lord Knows" (which features uncredited vocals by Canadian artist Tory Lanez), and the tenth entry, "Check", were later included on a soundtrack to the 2015 boxing drama film, Creed, which was released later in November of that year. The Creed soundtrack was also published by Atlantic Records, the current distribution label for Mill's label, Maybach Music Group.

Critical reception

Dreams Worth More Than Money received generally positive reviews from music critics. At Metacritic, which assigns a normalized rating out of 100 to reviews from critics, the album received an average score of 74, based on 13 reviews. Marcus Dowling of HipHopDX said, "Dreams Worth More Than Money is a slight misfire for Meek Mill, but enough is there the we think he can eventually achieve in his music the high he’s achieved in his personal life." David Jeffries of AllMusic described the album as divided "between weighty, radio-aimed numbers and loud, Gucci Mane-styled party tracks," while he also claimed that "the unfettered Dreams Worth More Than Money swaggers with the utmost confidence, ferociously declaring its reckless supremacy during the Rick Ross feature 'Been That'." Jeffries concluded his review by writing that "the street-worthy effort seems more influenced by Maybach Music than Minaj, as it forsakes the paparazzi and gossip pages for the better and continues on the path first laid out on the man's mixtapes."

Awards

Commercial performance
The album debuted at number one on the US Billboard 200, selling 246,000 equivalent album units (215,000 in pure album sales) in the United States, became the artist's first number-one album and the largest sales week since Dreams and Nightmares. It is also the fourth largest sales in the first week for an album of the year. The album spent a second week atop the chart, which was adjusted to an eleven-day tracking period due to alterations in Billboards tracking week schedule. This period included the previous weeks sales, as well as four days into the following week. After spending 2 weeks at number one, the album fell to number 3 in the third week on chart, with 95,000 units earned in the week ending July 16. By the end of 2015, Dreams Worth More Than Money had sold 350,000 copies domestically.

 Track listing Notes  signifies a co-producer
  signifies an additional producer
 "Classic" features background vocals from Jeremih
 “Stand Up” features uncredited vocals from DJ KhaledSample credits'
 "Lord Knows" contains samples from "Mozart's Requiem Lacrimosa" performed by Slovak Philharmonic Orchestra and Choir.
 "All Eyes on You" contains an interpolation from "Notorious Thugs" performed by The Notorious B.I.G.
 "The Trillest" contains a sample and excerpts from "Gone" performed by The Eden Project.
 "Ambitionz" contains an interpolation from "Ambitionz Az A Ridah" performed by 2Pac.
 "Been That" contains samples from "The Upset" performed by Paul Kelly.
 "Bad for You" contains samples from "Heart Attack" performed by Flight Facilities featuring Owl Eyes.

Charts

Weekly charts

Year-end charts

Certifications

See also
 List of Billboard 200 number-one albums of 2015
 List of Billboard number-one R&B/Hip-Hop albums of 2015

References

2015 albums
Meek Mill albums
Maybach Music Group albums
Albums produced by DJ Khaled
Albums produced by Jahlil Beats
Albums produced by Vinylz
Albums produced by Boi-1da
Albums produced by Cardo
Albums produced by Bangladesh (record producer)
Albums produced by Metro Boomin
Albums produced by Southside (record producer)
Albums produced by Danja (record producer)
Albums produced by Cubeatz
Atlantic Records albums